The SAF Scholarship, formerly known as the SAF Overseas Scholarship (SAFOS), is a scholarship conferred by the Public Service Commission (PSC). The scholarship is second in prestige to the President's Scholarship. 

Scholars are groomed for the highest levels of command and management in the Singapore Armed Forces (SAF) and beyond. They will generally do another post-graduate degree in Master of Business Administration (MBA), Master of Public Administration (MPA) or Master of Public Policy (MPP) overseas in the middle of their careers to prepare themselves for appointments beyond the SAF. Upon graduation, scholars go through different tour of duty from other cadet officers.

Selection
The scholarship is awarded to outstanding officer cadets with excellent A-Level or IB Diploma results, impressive co-curricular activities and outstanding performance in the Officer Cadet School (OCS). Candidates must also graduate from Basic Military Training (BMT) with an acceptable leadership score and excel in their Individual Physical Proficiency Test (IPPT).

After they are selected through rigorous rounds of interviews, scholars must complete and pass the 9-month Officer Cadet Course and receive their commission, before leaving for undergraduate studies. Medical or dentistry candidates will disrupt their cadet course for studies before returning for a 3-month Medical Officer Cadet Course (MOCC). Upon graduation, they will return to serve in the Singapore Armed Forces (SAF).

Their overseas studies typically takes place in the United Kingdom or United States. Popular choices amongst scholars include universities such as Imperial College London, University of Cambridge, University of Oxford, Harvard University, Massachusetts Institute of Technology, Stanford University, Princeton University, University of Chicago, and University of California, Berkeley.

Career prospects
Graduates receive their promotion to the rank of Captain (CPT) after a year of returning to service, thereafter serve 2-year command/instructor/staff tours, typically reaching the rank of Lieutenant-Colonel (LTC) and receive their battalion command by their 12-year of service. The rapid promotion and high salaries is to maintain competitiveness for the best minds in a highly educated society.

Most scholars will go on to complete post-graduate qualifications in Public Administration or Engineering from the Ivy League or Oxbridge universities. It is also common for these scholars to be headhunted to join the private sector or inducted into political offices.

Notable recipients

Politics
 Lee Hsien Loong, Prime Minister
 Teo Chee Hean, Senior Minister
 Chan Chun Sing, Minister for Education
 Tan Chuan-Jin, Speaker of Parliament 
 George Yeo, Former Minister for Foreign Affairs
 Lim Swee Say, Former Minister for Manpower
 Lim Hng Kiang, Former Minister for Trade and Industry

Military
 Melvyn Ong, Chief of Defence Force
 Desmond Kuek, Former Chief of Defence Force
 Bey Soo Khiang, Former Chief of Defence Force
 Neo Kian Hong, Former Chief of Defence Force
 Perry Lim, Former Chief of Defence Force
 Lim Neo Chian, Former Chief of Army
 Ng Chee Khern, Former Chief of Air Force
 Lew Chuen Hong, Former Chief of Navy
 Ng Chee Peng, Former Chief of Navy

Public Service
 Lee Seow Hiang, Chief Executive of Changi Airport Group
 Peter Ho, Former Head of the Civil Service

See also
 SAF Merit Scholarship (Women)

References

1. Speech by Minister for Defence Dr Ng Eng Hen at the 2013 Singapore Armed Forces Overseas Scholarship Award Presentation Ceremony
http://www.mindef.gov.sg/content/imindef/press_room/official_releases/sp/2013/29jul13_speech.html

Government scholarships
Military of Singapore